John Gully (born 15 July 1957) is a New Zealand cricketer. He played in three first-class matches for Canterbury in 1982/83.

See also
 List of Canterbury representative cricketers

References

External links
 

1957 births
Living people
New Zealand cricketers
Canterbury cricketers
Cricketers from Nelson, New Zealand